Black athletes may refer to:
 1968 Olympics Black Power salute
 Black  athletic superiority
 Black participation in college basketball
 Black players in American professional football
 Black players in the NBA
 Forty Million Dollar Slaves, a book by William C. Rhoden